Miguel Eduardo Rodríguez Torres (born 21 January 1964) was the Minister of the Popular Power for Interior, Justice and Peace of Venezuela from 2013, until he was replaced by Carmen Meléndez on 24 October 2014.

Early life

Torres was born in 1964 at the Dr. Carlos Arvelo Military Hospital in Caracas.

Military career
In 1980, he attended the Military Academy of Venezuela.

1992 coup attempt

During the February 1992 coup attempt carried out by Hugo Chávez, Rodríguez Torres took part in the conspiracy. Chávez's goal, assisted by Cuban president Fidel Castro, was to capture and kill President Carlos Andrés Pérez and then establish former president Rafael Caldera into the presidency. Rodríguez Torres, an army captain at the time, was given the task of capturing and killing President Pérez after another coup conspirator refused to participate after discovering that Rafael Caldera would be placed as president.

President Pérez, who had recently arrived from Davos, learned of the coup threat upon his return, leaving the airport in a concealed fashion which surprised Rodríguez Torres, who quickly pursued the fleeing president with his fellow militants, firing at his vehicle. Ultimately, the coup failed and the conspirators, including Rodríguez Torres, were imprisoned. After being jailed for 25 months, Rodríguez Torres was released in 1994 through an act of amnesty by Caldera, who had just been elected president.

Political career
Rodríguez Torres was director of the Bolivarian National Intelligence Service, Venezuela's intelligence services, from 2002 to 2013.

Following the election of Nicolás Maduro into the presidency in April 2013, Rodríguez Torres was made the Minister of the Popular Power for Interior, Justice and Peace. After the murder of former Miss Venezuela Mónica Spear, an incident that provoked widespread outrage, he declared there would be "adjustments to police structures and operations" and "to existing anti-crime plans"

Under his ministerial oversight during the 2014 Venezuelan protests, he ordered repressive acts against peaceful protesters, with two of his own close associates killing the first victims of the protest movement on 12 February 2014, causing further unrest.

Following an October 2014 incident in which multiple colectivo members were killed during a CICPC raid, members of colectivos called for Rodríguez Torres to be removed from his interior minister position. Days later on 24 October 2014, Rodríguez Torres was removed from his position during a state-run television program.

Among other Venezuelan officials, he is banned from entering Colombia.  The Colombian government maintains a list of people banned from entering Colombia or subject to expulsion; as of January 2019, the list had 200 people with a "close relationship and support for the Nicolás Maduro regime".

Dissident
As of 2017, Rodríguez Torres had been an increasingly vocal critic of the government, alongside dissident chief state prosecutor Luisa Ortega Díaz. In May, news outlets reported that he was considering a bid for the presidency, offering a 'third way' or middle ground between the opposition and Chavismo.  In June 2017, he expressed his opposition to the presidential initiative to convene a National Constituent Assembly, and called instead for the scheduling of new elections.

Arrest
On 13 March 2018, Rodríguez Torres, who had spoken the previous day at an opposition rally, was arrested by SEBIN agents and brought to the Dirección General de Contrainteligencia Militar headquarters in Sucre, Miranda. The Bolivarian government stated that the general had attempted to sow discord among the Venezuelan armed forces.

References

1964 births
Living people
People of the Crisis in Venezuela
Venezuelan defectors
Venezuelan Ministers of Interior
Politicians from Caracas
Prisoners and detainees of Venezuela
Venezuelan prisoners and detainees
People of the 1992 Venezuelan coup d'état attempts
Justice ministers of Venezuela